Pseudoxandra is a genus of plant in family Annonaceae. It contains the following species:
 Pseudoxandra angustifolia Maas
 Pseudoxandra atrata Maas
 Pseudoxandra cuspidata Maas
 Pseudoxandra leiophylla (Diels) R.E.Fr.
 Pseudoxandra longipes Maas
 Pseudoxandra lucida R.E.Fr.
 Pseudoxandra pacifica Maas
 Pseudoxandra papillosa Maas
 Pseudoxandra parvifolia Maas
 Pseudoxandra polyphleba (Diels) R.E.Fr.
 Pseudoxandra sclerocarpa Maas
 Pseudoxandra vallicola Maas
 Pseudoxandra williamsii (R.E.Fr.) R.E.Fr.

References

 
Annonaceae genera
Taxonomy articles created by Polbot